Marta McDowell is an American author.

She worked as a horticulturist for five years at the Reeves-Reed Arboretum.

She is on the Board of the New Jersey Historical Garden Foundation at the Cross Estate.

Books
Unearthing The Secret Garden: The Plants and Places That Inspired Frances Hodgson Burnett (Timber Press, 2021)
Emily Dickinson's Gardening Life: The Plants and Places That Inspired the Iconic Poet ‎ (Timber Press, 2019)
The World of Laura Ingalls Wilder: The Frontier Landscapes that Inspired the Little House Books ‎ (Timber Press, 2017)
All the Presidents' Gardens: Madison's Cabbages to Kennedy's Roses—How the White House Grounds Have Grown with America ‎ (Timber Press, 2016)

References

External links

21st-century American women writers
Year of birth missing (living people)
Living people
Place of birth missing (living people)
21st-century American non-fiction writers
American women non-fiction writers